A Holy Ghost hole, or Holy Spirit hole, is a circular opening in the ceiling of a church which symbolises the descent of the Holy Spirit on the day of Pentecost. The openings are often used for liturgical performances.

They were most commonly built in churches in Austria and southern Germany during the Middle Ages and Baroque period, though classicizing architectural elements often replicate their appearance. Baroque organ sound-holes, in particular, were often decorated or disguised as Holy Ghost holes. Other features of church architecture which are similarly built into the apex of a ceiling or dome, such as oculi, often closely resemble Holy Ghost holes.

Decoration 
Holy Ghost holes are typically decorated with Pentecostal motifs, such as doves, rays of light, and flames. The hole may be permanently left open, displaying a dove figurine or other depictions of the holy spirit. However, the holes are often covered by latticework or a wooden lid which is only opened during liturgical performances.

In some cases, the decorations surrounding the hole may be relatively neutral. For example, they may be surrounded by depictions of angels with instruments, without symbols tying the scene to any particular biblical story. In which cases it can be assumed that it was used for several liturgical performances throughout the year, such as the ascension, not just pentecost.

Usage 
Holy Ghost holes have been used in a variety of ways during Pentecost sermons to symbolise the descent of the Holy Spirit. Live doves may have previously been released from the openings during the Middle Ages, though the practice has been replaced by dove figurines, suspended from the ceiling and lowered through the opening. To symbolise the "tongues of fire" as described in Acts 2:3, burning oakum was often dropped from the hole onto the congregation below. Today, rose petals are more commonly released, as is most famously done at the Parthenon.

In addition to pentecostal ceremonies, the holes may also be used for the Feast of the Ascension. During the ceremony, a figurine or statue of Jesus is lifted up through the ceiling, suspended by a string, symbolising the Ascension of Jesus. Documentation of this tradition dates as early as the baroque period. The tradition is still practiced in some churches in rural Austria and Germany.

Gallery

Notes

References 

Pentecost
Ornaments (architecture)
Church architecture